Rana dynasty was a Chhetri dynasty that imposed totalitarianism in the Kingdom of Nepal from 1846 until 1951, reducing the Shah monarch to a figurehead and making Prime Minister and other government positions held by the Ranas hereditary. They claimed Kshatriya status themselves. Rana dynasty is historically known for the iron-fisted rule. This changed after the Revolution of 1951 with the promulgation of a new constitution, when power shifted back to the monarchy of King Tribhuvan.

The Rana dynasty descended from the Kunwar family, a nobility of the Gorkha Kingdom. Due to the marital lineages with the politically reigning Thapa dynasty (of Mukhtiyar Bhimsen Thapa) from early 19th century, Ranas gained entry to central Darbar politics. Ranas were also linked to a minor faction of the Pande dynasty of Gorkha through the Thapa dynasty.

Origins 
Chronicler Daniel Wright has published the genealogy of Jang Bahadur Kunwar Rana. The genealogy begins with Tattā Rāṇā as Raja (King) of Chittaurgarh. His nephew Fakht Siṃha Rāṇā had a son named Rāma Siṃha Rāṇā, who came to hills after the siege of Chittaur. He was employed by a hill Raja for ten or twelve months who wanted to retain Rāma Siṃha in his country. The hill Raja asked for the daughter of Raja of Bīnātī, a Bagāle Kṣetrī and married her to Rāma Siṃha. They had six sons over 10–12 years, one of whom was recognized by the title of Kum̐vara Khaḍkā for bravery displayed in the battle against Raja of Satān Koṭ. The title was used by his descendants. Rāma Siṃha was suddenly met by his younger brother who requested him to return Chittaur for once and Rāma Siṃha died reaching there. The hill Raja made Rāma Siṃha's son Rāut Kunwar a nobleman (Sardār) and commandant of the army. Ahirāma Kunwar, a son of Rāut Kunwar, was invited by King of Kaski and was made nobleman with a birta or jagir of Dhuage Saghu village. King of Kaski asked the hand of Ahirāma's daughter, who was a great beauty through only Kalas Puja to which Ahirāma replied to give his daughter only through lawful marriage. King brought his troops and tried to take on the village by force. Ahirāma was supported by the villagers belonging to Parājulī Thāpā caste and a war was initiated. On the same day, Ahirāma took his immediate family including two sons namely; Ram Krishna Kunwar and Jaya Krishna Kunwar, to King of Gorkha, Prithvi Narayan Shah where lands of Kunwar-Khola was given to them as birta.

John Whelpton opines that Kunwar origin legend which states that first of their ancestors to enter hill married a daughter of Bagale Kshetri might have directed their family links to Bagale Thapa, the clan of Mukhtiyar Bhimsen Thapa.

Rana dynasts; Prabhakar, Gautam and Pashupati Shamsher Jang Bahadur Rana claim the descent of Ranas of Nepal from Kunwar Kumbhakaran Singh, younger brother of Guhila King of Mewar, Rawal Ratnasimha. During the first siege of Chittorgarh in 1303 A.D., Kumbhakaran Singh's descendants left Mewar to north towards Himalayan foothills according to the book " Rana's Of Nepal" where the preface is written by Arvind Singh Mewar. The Rana dynasty claimed to be Rajputs of western Indian origin, rather than the native Khas Kshatriyas despite they spoke Khas language and attempted to disassociate from their Khas past. Also, many historians are of the opinion that ruling families in Nepal often claim Indian Rajput descent for the political purposes. The Ranas claimed the Vatsa gotra.

Historical background 

The founder of this dynasty was Jang Bahadur Kunwar Rana, who belonged to the Kunwar family, which was then considered a noble family of Kshatriya status. Jang Bahadur was a son of Gorkhali governor Bal Narsingh Kunwar and nephew of Mathabarsingh Thapa, the reigning Prime Minister of Nepal (1843–1845) from the Thapa dynasty. Bal Narsingh Kunwar was the son of Kaji Ranajit Kunwar and grandson of Sardar Ram Krishna Kunwar, who was prominent military general of King Prithvi Narayan Shah. Ram Krishna Kunwar was born to Ahiram Kunwar. There were ample of rewards and recognitions received by Sardar Ram Krishna Kunwar from the Gorkhali monarch Prithvi Narayan. His grandson Bal Narsingh was initially a follower of the renounced King Rana Bahadur Shah and Kaji Bhimsen Thapa, and followed the King in his exile to Banaras on 1 May 1800. On the night of 25 April 1806, King Rana Bahadur was killed by step-brother Sher Bahadur in desperation after which Bal Narsingh immediately killed the King's assassin. He was a close ally of the influential minister Bhimsen Thapa, who initiated a great massacre at Bhandarkhal garden following the chaos from the King's murder. Following closeness to Mukhtiyar Bhimsen, he became the son-in-law of Bhimsen's brother Kaji  Nain Singh Thapa of Thapa dynasty. The close relatives and supporters of Thapa faction replaced the old courtiers and administrators. The Kunwar family came to power being relatives of powerful Mukhtiyar Bhimsen Thapa. Similarly, Kunwars were related to Pande dynasty by their maternal grandmother Rana Kumari Pande who was daughter of Mulkaji Ranajit Pande.

Rise of Jung Bahadur 

Bal Narsingh's son Kaji Jung Bahadur Kunwar became a significant person in the central politics of Nepal during the prime ministership of his uncle Mathabar Singh Thapa. On 17 May 1845 around 11 pm, Mathabar Singh was summoned to the royal palace and was assassinated in a cold blood by Jung Bahadur on the royal orders. He was considered to have been merciless, ruthless and fatal due to his association with Mathabar Singh. Jung Bahadur was made a Kaji (equivalent to minister) after following the order of assassination of Mathabar.

On the night of 14 September 1846, Queen Rajya Lakshmi Devi summoned the courtiers on the mysterious murderer of her aide General Kaji Gagan Singh, to which courtiers hurried to the Kot quickly. Many of the courtiers were unarmed except for a sword, as they had responded immediately to the royal summons. The armies allocated by Jung Bahadur Rana also had taken most of the arms of courtiers who had managed to bring them. Queen Rajya Lakshmi Devi and King Rajendra Bikram Shah were also present in the Kot. Queen Rajya Lakshmi demanded the execution of Kaji Bir Keshar (Kishor) Pande on alleged suspicion to which General Abhiman Singh Rana Magar looked towards King for confirmation. Jang misinformed Queen that Abhiman Singh's troops were arriving for overpowering the Queen's faction and demanded an immediate arrest. Abhiman tried to force his way out and was killed by Jung's soldier. In the chaos followed, Jung and his brothers began bloodshed and many rival nobles and courtiers were eliminated by them. The letter to British Resident Henry Montgomery Lawrence stated that there were 32 Bharadars (courtiers) killed in the massacre.

Kot massacre episode
When Jang Bahadur refused the Junior Queen's request to place Prince Ranendra in the place of Crown Prince Surendra of Nepal, the Queen secretly contacted the victims of Kot and conspired to assassinate Jung Bahadur in the royal Bhandarkhal garden. After receiving a command from the Queen to come to Bhandarkhal, Jang Bahadur took his fully armed troops and headed towards the garden. The troops killed the chief conspirator, Birdhwaj Basnyat on the way, and marched towards Bhandarkhal where seeing Jang Bahadur approach fully armed with his troops, the other conspirators started to flee. 23 people were killed in the massacre while 15 escaped. In the 23rd of September 1846, all officers of military and bureaucracy were called upon to their respective offices within 10 days. Then, Jung Bahadur appointed his brothers and nephews to the highest ranks of the government. He consolidated the position of premiership after conducting Kot massacre (Kot Parva) and Bhandarkhal Parva on the basic templates provided by his maternal grand-uncle Mukhtiyar Bhimsen Thapa.

Rana Regime; Rule of Jang
After the massacres of Kot and Bhandarkhal, the Thapas, Pandes, Basnyats and other citizens had settled in Banaras. Similarly, some citizens had gone to settle in Nautanwa and Bettiah. Chautariya Guru Prasad Shah too had gone to live with the King of Bettiah. After knowing about the presence of the King and the Queen in Benaras, Guru Prasad went there and started to congregate an army and a plan to execute Jung Bahadur started to be formed.

Battle of Alau
On 12 May 1847, Jung Bahadur gave a speech in Tundikhel. There he accused the King of the attempted assassination of the Prince and the Prime Minister. The Council then decided to dethrone King Rajendra deeming him mentally ill, and on the same day Surendra was crowned as the new king of Nepal. Hearing the news of the coronation of Surendra, Rajendra decided to take the responsibility of removing Jung Bahadur upon himself and declaring himself as the leader of the army, he left Benaras. Rajendra then appointed Guru Prasad Shah as the Chief of the Army for the operation of removal of Jung Bahadur Rana from Nepal and started to accumulate weapons and training the troops. Antagonism from the British-India Company forced Rajendra and his troops to enter Nepal. On 23 July, the troops reached a village called Alau in Bara and set a camp there. One spy group of the Government of Nepal was keeping close eyes on the event of the rebel groups at Bettiah. They sent the news to Jung Bahadur, immediately after which he sent a troop in the leadership of Sanak Singh Tandon to Alau. They were told to suppress the rebellions, arrest Rajendra and bring him to Kathmandu. On 27 July, the Gorakhnath Paltan (Gorakhnath Battalion) reached and rested in a village called Simraungadh, not too far from Alau. The battle of Alau was a decisive one between the forces of King Rajendra and Jang Bahadur. The King lost significantly in the battle. If the massacre of Kot had established Jung Bahadur as a dictator, the battle of Alau had helped him strengthen his dictatorship. Rajendra was imprisoned in an old palace in Bhaktapur.

Rise to royalty 
On 15 May 1848, a Lal Mohar (Red sealed document) was issued claiming descent from Ranas of Mewar and authorizing the Kunwar family of Jang Bahadur to style themselves as Kunwar Ranaji. On 6 August 1856, Jang Bahadur Kunwar (now Ranaji) was conferred the title of Maharaja (Great King) of Kaski and Lamjung, two former hill principalities, by King of Nepal, Surendra Bikram Shah.

Rana Regime; Rule of the Shamshers
 
 
 
 
 
 
 
 
 
 
 
 

In 1885, the Shumsher family, the nephews of Jung Bahadur Kunwar Rana, murdered many of the sons of Jung Bahadur and took over Nepal in a military coup d'état thus bringing in the rule of the Shumsher Rana family also known as the Satra Bhai (17 brothers) Rana family. They murdered Ranodip Singh Kunwar and occupied the hereditary throne of Prime Minister. After this they added Jang Bahadur to their name, although they were descended from Jang's younger brother Dhir Shumsher.

Kunwar family tree

Rana Prime Ministers 
Nine Rana rulers took the hereditary office(s) of Prime Minister, Supreme Commander-in-Chief and Grand Master of the Royal Orders. All were crowned as the Maharaja of Lamjung and Kaski.

 Ranajit Kunwar Rana (1723–1815)
  Bal Narsingh Kunwar Rana (1783–1841)
  I. Shrī Tīn Jung Bahadur Kunwar Rana GCB, GCSI (18 June 1816 – 25 February 1877). Prime Minister and C-in-C 15 September 1846 to 1 August 1856 and from 28 June 1857 until his death. Granted the hereditary title of Rana on 5 May 1848, as a suffix to the male members of his family. Granted the hereditary title of Maharaja of Lamjung and Kaski (to be enjoyed ‘offspring to offspring’, and the hereditary offices of Prime Minister and C-in-C (to be enjoyed in succession by his surviving brothers, his sons, then his nephews), 6 August 1856. Received a salute of 19 guns from the British.
 Bam Bahadur Kunwar Rana (1818 – 25 May 1857; Prime Minister: 1 August 1856 – 25 May 1857)
  II. Shrī Tīn Ranodip Singh Kunwar (aka Ranodip Singh Rana) KCSI (3 April 1825 – assassinated 22 November 1885). Ruled 25 February 1877 to 22 November 1885.
  General Sri Dhir Shumsher Kunwar Rana (1828–1884)
  III. Shrī Tīn Bir Shumsher Jung Bahadur Rana GCSI (10 December 1852 – 5 March 1901). Ruled 22 November 1885 to 5 March 1901.
  IV. Shrī Tīn Dev Shumsher Jung Bahadur Rana (17 July 1862 – 20 February 1914). Ruled 5 March to 27 June 1901, when as a result of his progressive nature, he was deposed by his relatives and exiled to India.
  V. Shrī Tīn Chandra Shumsher Jung Bahadur Rana GCB, GCSI, GCMG, GCVO (8 July 1863 – 26 November 1929). Ruled 27 June 1901 to 26 November 1929.
   IX. Shrī Tīn Mohan Shumsher Jung Bahadur Rana GCB, GCIE, GBE (23 December 1885 – 6 January 1967). Ruled 30 April 1948 to 18 February 1951, at which date he was divested of his titles and later went to India.
  VI. Shrī Tīn Bhim Shumsher Jang Bahadur Rana GCSI, GCMG, KCVO (16 April 1865 – 1 September 1932). Ruled 26 November 1929 to 1 September 1932.
   VIII. Shrī Tīn Padma Shumsher Jung Bahadur Rana GCSI, GCIE, GBE, (5 December 1882 – 11 April 1961). Ruled 29 November 1945 to 30 April 1948, whereupon he abdicated in favor of his cousin.
   VII. Shrī Tīn Juddha Shumsher Jung Bahadur Rana GCB, GCSI, GCIE (19 April 1875 – 20 November 1952). Ruled 1 September 1932 to 29 November 1945, whereupon he abdicated in favour of his nephew.

Succession 
Succession to the role of the Prime Ministers and the title of Shree Teen Maharaja of Nepal and Maharaja of Lamjung and Kaski was by agnatic seniority, by which the oldest male heir among the sons of equal (a-class) marriages in a generation would succeed. The order of succession was determined by seniority, with each eligible male heir holding a military command, as follows:

 Prime Minister and Commander-in-Chief (Mukhtiyar the Heir Apparent, with the rank of Field Marshal).
 Western Commanding-General.
 Eastern Commanding-General.
 Southern Commanding-General.
 Northern Commanding-General.

Notable Rana members
Jang Bahadur Kunwar Rana
Bam Bahadur Kunwar
Ranodip Singh Kunwar
Bir Shumsher Jang Bahadur Rana
Dev Shamsher Jang Bahadur Rana
Chandra Shamsher Jang Bahadur Rana
Bhim Shamsher Jang Bahadur Rana
Juddha Shamsher Jang Bahadur Rana
Rudra Shamsher Jang Bahadur Rana
Padma Shamsher Jang Bahadur Rana
Mohan Shamsher Jang Bahadur Rana
Baber Shamsher Jang Bahadur Rana
Kaiser Shamsher Jang Bahadur Rana
Kiran Shamsher Rana
Nir Shamsher Jang Bahadur Rana
Toran Shumsher J.B.R.
Nara Shumsher J.B.R.
Ratna Shumsher J.B.R.
Pradip Shumsher J.B.R.
Satchit Shamsher Jung Bahadur Rana
Pashupati Shamsher Jang Bahadur Rana
Madhukar Shamsher Rana
Om Bikram Rana
Gaurav Shumsher JB Rana
Udaya Shumsher Rana,
 Himalaya Shamsher Rana
 Prabhakar Shamsher Rana

Other notable connected members
Ranajit Pande, maternal grandfather of Ganesh Kumari, mother of Jung Bahadur Rana
George Jivaji Rao Scindia, father-in-law of Pashupati Shamsher Jang Bahadur Rana.
Prithvi Bahadur Pande, son-in-law of Himalaya Shamsher JBR

Gallery

See also 
 Lamjang and Kaski
 Daudaha system
 Pajani System
 rajputs of Nepal
 Rolls of Succession in Rana (Nepal)
 History of Nepal
 Rana palaces of Nepal
 Thapa dynasty

References

Footnotes

Notes

Bibliography

External links 
 Friend in need:1857, Friendship forgotten:1887 William Digby
 Old pictures of Nepal from Rana Dynasty

 
Nepalese monarchy
Rana regime
Rajput rulers
Dynasties of Nepal
19th-century establishments in Nepal
1951 disestablishments in Nepal